Sajjad Aghaei (born 19 March 1999) is an Iranian football forward, who currently plays for Aluminium Arak in Persian Gulf Pro League.

Club career

Esteghlal
On 3 July 2017, he signed a five-year contract with Esteghlal. He made his debut for Esteghlal Tehran on 27 July 2018 against Paykan.

Aluminum Arak
He played 6 games for Aluminum this season and scored 1 goal.

Club career statistics

References

1999 births
Living people
Esteghlal F.C. players
Iranian footballers
Association football forwards